Goddard's Green is a hamlet and part of the civil parish of Wokefield in Berkshire, England. The Garth and South Berks Hunt had kennels here until 2002.

References

External links

Hamlets in Berkshire
West Berkshire District